The 2017 Glastonbury Festival of Contemporary Performing Arts took place between 21 and 25 June. The three headlining acts were Radiohead, Foo Fighters and Ed Sheeran with Barry Gibb performing in the iconic Legend's Slot.

Tickets
General Admission Tickets for the festival cost £238 for the full weekend.

Weather
The weather was around 30 °C on 21 June with temperatures potentially reaching 10 °C higher than usual for the festival.

Line-up
Headlining the festival were Radiohead, Foo Fighters and Ed Sheeran on the Friday, Saturday and Sunday respectively. Labour Party leader Jeremy Corbyn also made an appearance on the Pyramid Stage on the Saturday.

Pyramid Stage

A.  Kris Kristofferson's set featured guest appearances from Johnny Depp and Margo Price. 
B. Jools Holland's set featured guest appearances from Chris Difford, Louise Marshall and Ruby Turner. 
C. Run the Jewels' set featured a guest appearance from DJ Shadow. 

The set by Foo Fighters was notable for the televised appearance in the crowd of a naked man, to whom Dave Grohl dedicated the song "My Hero".

Actor Bradley Cooper, co-producer, director, and star of the 2018 film A Star Is Born, filmed a four-minute segment of his film with Lady Gaga on the Pyramid Stage, using part of Kris Kristofferson's set.

Other Stage

West Holts Stage

John Peel Stage

Glastonbury Festival 2018 
Festival founder Michael Eavis announced on 26 June 2017 that there would be no Glastonbury 2018 in order to give "the farm, the village and the festival team the traditional year off" until Glastonbury Festival 2019. The previous "fallow year" was in 2012.

References

External links

2017 in British music
2017 in England
2010s in Somerset
2017
June 2017 events in the United Kingdom